I. gracilis may refer to:
 Ipomoea gracilis, a plant species found in Australia
 Ischnocalanus gracilis, a copepod species in the genus Ischnocalanus
 Isodontosaurus gracilis, a prehistoric lizard species in the genus Isodontosaurus

See also
 Gracilis (disambiguation)